Karilyn is a given name that is a variation of Caroline. Notable people known by this name include the following:

Karilyn Bonilla Colón, Puerto Rican politician
Karilyn Brown (born 1947), American politician
Karilyn Pilch (born 1986), American ice hockey executive

See also

Karalyn Patterson
Kari Lynn Dell
Karilynn Ming Ho
Kari-Lynn Winters
Karlyn
Karolyn